The 2001 Philippine Basketball Association (PBA) Governors' Cup was the third conference of the 2001 PBA season. It started on September 8 and ended on December 16. The tournament is an Import-laden format, which requires an import or a pure-foreign player for each team.

Format
The following format will be observed for the duration of the conference:
The teams were divided into 2 groups.

Group A:
Alaska Aces
Batang Red Bull Thunder
Purefoods TJ Hotdogs
Shell Turbo Chargers
Sta. Lucia Realtors

Group B:
Barangay Ginebra Kings
Pop Cola Panthers
San Miguel Beermen
Talk 'N Text Phone Pals
Tanduay Rhum Masters

 Teams in a group will play against each other twice and against teams in the other group once; 13 games per team.  
 The top eight teams after the eliminations will advance to the quarterfinals.
Quarterfinals:
Top four teams will have a twice-to-beat advantage against their opponent.
QF1: #1 vs. #8
QF2: #2 vs. #7
QF3: #3 vs. #6
QF4: #4 vs. #5
Best-of-five semifinals:
SF1: QF1 vs. QF4
SF2: QF2 vs. QF3
Third-place playoff: losers of the semifinals
Best-of-seven finals: winners of the semifinals

Imports
The following is the list of imports with the replacement imports being highlighted. GP is the number of games played in the conference.

Elimination round

Team standings

Bracket

Quarterfinals

(1) Shell vs. (8) Barangay Ginebra

(2) Sta. Lucia vs. (7) Red Bull

(3) Pop Cola vs. (6) Alaska

(4) San Miguel vs. (5) Talk 'N Text

Semifinals

(1) Shell vs. (4) San Miguel

(2) Sta. Lucia vs. (3) Pop Cola

Third place playoff

Finals

References

External links
 PBA.ph

PBA Governors' Cup
Governors' Cup